Nebraska's 6th congressional district is an obsolete district.  It was created after the 1890 census and abolished after the 1930 census.

List of members representing the district

References

 Congressional Biographical Directory of the United States 1774–present

06
Former congressional districts of the United States
1893 establishments in Nebraska
1933 disestablishments in Nebraska